Limit of Love is the third studio album of the Australian indie band Boy & Bear. It was released on 9 October 2015, in Australia, New Zealand, USA and Canada, and on 30 October in the UK and EU.

"Walk the Wire" was the single release from the album accompanied by a music video.

Track listing
"Limit of Love" (3:31)
"Walk the Wire" (2:59)
"Where'd You Go" (3:09)
"Hollow Ground" (3:40)
"Breakdown Slow" (3:56)
"Showdown" (4:22)
"A Thousand Faces" (2:52)
"Man Alone" (3:17)
"Ghost 11" (3:27)
"Just Dumb" (5:13)
"Fox Hole" (3:25)

Charts

Certifications

See also
 List of number-one albums of 2015 (Australia)

References

2015 albums
Boy & Bear albums